Maria Landini ( 1668 – 22 June 1722) was an Italian soprano who began her career as a singer at the court of Queen Christina in Rome but was primarily active at the imperial court in Vienna from 1711 until her death. She created numerous soprano roles in operas and oratorios by Fux, Caldara, and her second husband, Francesco Bartolomeo Conti and was reputedly the highest paid musician in Vienna at the time.

Life and career
Landini's mother, Francesca Portui, was the maid of Queen Christina of Sweden and married to Francesco Landini, the captain of Christina's guards. However, Francesco Landini was not her real father. Maria was born from a relationship between her mother and the marquise Orazio Del Monte, Christina's chamberlain. According to 17th-century sources, she was born in Hamburg where Christina's court periodically sojourned, although the date of her birth has variously been given as 1667, 1668, and 1670. Maria spent her entire childhood and youth at the court of Queen Christina where she was trained as a singer and was known by the diminutive "Mariuccia". By the late 1680s there are records of her regularly performing in private musical evenings at Queen Christina's court in Rome. She often sang together with another favourite singer of the queen, Angela Voglia (known as "La Giorgina").

After Queen Christina's death in 1689, Landini entered the service of Sophia Charlotte of Hanover in Germany. She married an actor named "Chateauneuf" in Hannover in 1695 and sometimes appeared under the name "Landini di Chateauneuf" or its Italian version "Castelnovo". According to Francesco Conti's biographer Hermine Williams, Castelnovo was from an aristocratic family and his full name was Mallo di Castelnuovo. Their marriage would produce three children: Ferdinando, Francesca, and Caterina. Landini was active in the opera houses of Italy from 1698 when she was in the service of the Duke of Mantua. Her earliest appearance in Mantua was in 1698 in Giovanni Bononcini's Camilla. She also appeared in Venice, Genoa, Casale Monferrato, Livorno, Modena, and Bologna before moving to Vienna in 1710 where she became the prima donna of Emperior Charles VI's court theatre. In 1714, following the death of her first husband, Landini married Francesco Bartolomeo Conti in Vienna's Schottenkirche. In her will, written in the year prior to her death, she asked, if she should die in Vienna, to be buried in the Schottenkirche next to her first husband. But she eventually was not buried there, because she died outside of Vienna.

In 1725 Conti married Anna Maria Lorenzani who had succeeded Landini as the prima donna at the imperial court.

Roles created
Roles created by Maria Landini include:
Clori in Johann Joseph Fux's La decima fatica di Ercole, Habsburg court theatre, Vienna, 1710
Merope in Francesco Gasparini's Merope, Teatro San Cassiano, Venice, 26 December 1711
Dafne in Johann Joseph Fux's Dafne in lauro, Habsburg court theatre, Vienna, 1714
Euridice in Johann Joseph Fux's Orfeo ed Euridice, Habsburg court theatre, Vienna, 1715
Angelica in Johann Joseph Fux's Angelica, vincitrice di Alcina, Habsburg court theatre, Vienna, 1716
Ifigenia in Johann Joseph Fux's Diana plaeata, Habsburg court theatre, Vienna, 1717
Lucinda in Francesco Bartolomeo Conti's Don Chisciotte in Sierra Morena, Habsburg court theatre, Vienna, 6 February 1719

Notes

References

17th-century births
1722 deaths
Italian operatic sopranos
18th-century Italian women opera singers
Court of Christina, Queen of Sweden